The Abbots Bromley Horn Dance is an English folk dance dating back to the Middle Ages. The dance takes place each year in Abbots Bromley, a village in Staffordshire, England. The modern version of the dance involves reindeer antlers, a hobby horse, Maid Marian, and a Fool.

Origins
There are no recorded references to the horn dance prior to Robert Plot's Natural History of Staffordshire, written in 1686. However, there is a record of the hobby horse being used in Abbots Bromley as early as 1532, and it is possible that the horn dance component of the custom was also present at that time but not commented upon by the writer. A carbon analysis discovered that the antlers used in the dance date to the 11th century. 

According to some, the use of antlers suggests an Anglo-Saxon origin along with other native Anglo-Saxon traditions that have survived into modern times in various forms. It has been speculated, for example, that the dance originated in the pagan period and was connected with the ruling dynasty of Mercia, based some 15 miles away at Tamworth, who owned extensive hunting lands in Needwood Forest and Cannock Chase surrounding Abbots Bromley. On this theory, the royal forester would have organised sympathetic magic rituals to ensure a plentiful catch each year, a tradition that survived into Christian times and gradually came to be seen as affirming the villagers' hunting rights. Even when the lands were granted to Burton Abbey in 1004 a forester would still need to have been employed. By the 16th century, when the abbey was dissolved, this was a hereditary position with the title "Forester of Bentylee" (Bentylee being the wooded area of the parish). From then until the 19th century the dance remained the traditional prerogative of the Bentley family, eventually passing to the Fowell family in 1914. The Fowells continue to run it to this day.

Such an ancient origin for the dance has been doubted by some folklorists, who point out that while the reindeer antlers date to the 11th century, reindeer were long since extinct in England and Wales (and probably Scotland), and there is no evidence that any domestic reindeer herds remained at that time. Therefore, even more confusingly, the antlers must have been imported from Scandinavia at some point between the 11th and 17th centuries. This analysis may lend weight to the theory that the custom originally began with only a hobby horse, and the horn dance component was added later, explaining why only the former was mentioned by 16th century sources.

Event
The Horn Dance attracts a large number of visitors to the village.  As well as the dance itself, Wakes Monday sees a fair on the village green; Morris dancing; and numerous other attractions. The right to hold this fair was granted to the village in 1221.

Date and schedule of performance
The Horn Dance takes place on Wakes Monday, the day following Wakes Sunday, which is the first Sunday after 4 September. Violet Alford, a prominent student of folklore and folk dance, wrote in 1940 that the dance had previously taken place on the Twelfth Day, during the first week of January. According to Robert Plot, it has also been performed on Christmas Day and New Year's Day, in addition to the local Wakes Monday, though upon its revival in 1660 it was confined to the latter alone.

The dance starts at 08:00 with a service of blessing in St Nicholas Church, where the horns are housed. The dance begins on the village green, then passes out of the village – but not out of the parish – to Blithfield Hall, owned by the Bagot family.

The dancers return to the village in the early afternoon, and make their way around the pubs and houses. Finally, at about 20:00, the horns are returned to the church, and the day is concluded with a service of Compline.

Dancers

There are 12 dancers. Six carry the horns and they are accompanied by a musician playing an accordion (a violin in former times), Maid Marian (a man in a dress), the Hobby-horse, the Fool (or Jester), a youngster with a bow and arrow, and another youngster with a triangle. Traditionally, the dancers are all male, although in recent years girls have been seen carrying the triangle and bow and arrow.

Until the end of the 19th century the dancers were all members of the Bentley family. The dance passed to the related Fowell family in the early 20th century; this has continued to this day, though none of them lives in the village any longer; many live in nearby towns. They have been known to allow visitors to "dance in" if asked politely, and will often invite musicians and others to take part when necessary.

Antlers
The "horns" are six sets of reindeer antlers, three white and three black. In 1976, a small splinter was radiocarbon dated to around 1065. Since there are not believed to have been any reindeer in England in the 11th century, the horns must have been imported from Scandinavia. However, it is equally mysterious as to why this should have been done and by whom. If the antlers were imported it must have been near the date of their growth-dropping. It is, therefore, just as likely that reindeer did survive somewhere in England at that period.

The six sets of "horns" were formerly kept in the tower of St Nicholas Church, being hauled into position on the walls by ropes.  In "recent years" (1920s-1930s) special brackets were provided for them in the Hurst Chapel in the church where they were mounted on wooden heads carved by village craftsmen.  The horns were brought from Constantinople (present day Istanbul) by Lord Paget, who was British Ambassador to Turkey in the 18th century, but the original horns went back centuries before that, it being surmised that they date from a time when there were reindeer in this country.  The heaviest of the horns is 36 pounds and one of the horns has 36 points.

The antlers are mounted on small heads carved from wood. Since 1981, the horns are legally the property of Abbots Bromley Parish Council. For 364 days a year, they are on display in St Nicholas Church. They were once kept in the main Village Hall, which is now the Goat's Head Inn, beside the Butter Cross. An alternative set of antlers (red deer) are kept to use when the dancers are asked, as they frequently are, to perform outside the parish boundaries.

Dance

The dance itself is simple, since the antlers themselves have some weight to them and are large and bulky.

As described by Cecil Sharp in 1911, there are ten figures in the dance; six dancers bearing the horns, Maid Marian, the Hobby-horse, Boy with bow and arrow, and the Fool. He describes the circular dance as being done with the participants in a single line; however, it is currently performed with the dancers in a double column.

Music
Cecil Sharp gives two versions of the music. In his 1911 written description of the dance Sharp says he saw it being performed to "Yankee Doodle" and another simple melody in G major in 4/4 time. However, in his preface to the sheet music (dated 1912) Sharp says that he had received a version from a Mr. J. Buckley, who had noted down the music in 1857 or 1858 from "the fiddling of William (or Henry) Robinson, a wheelwright of Abbots Bromley, who was famous at the time as the only man who could play the Horn Dance air." This version has three sections in G and C minor, in 6/8 time.

Abbots Bromley Horn Dance Stamps issue
2019 - Royal Mail issue a collectable stamps edition of UK Weird and Wonderful Customs which includes Bog snorkelling at Llanwrtyd Wells, World Gurning Championship at Egremont, Up Helly Aa in Lerwick, Burning the Clocks in Brighton, 'Obby 'Oss festival in Padstow, Samhain Celtic festival (Halloween) at Derry, Cheese-Rolling at Cooper's Hill and Horn Dance at Abbots Bromley

References

External links
Information about the horn dance from the Abbots Bromley web site
Charlotte S. Burne. "Staffordshire Folk and their Lore" Folk-Lore. Volume 7, 1896. pp. 382–5 (illustrated).
Abbot's Bromley traditional dance tune

English folk dance
Festivals in Staffordshire
Ritual animal disguise